TSS Slieve Donard was a steam turbine passenger and cargo vessel operated by the London and North Western Railway from 1921 to 1923, and the London, Midland and Scottish Railway from 1923 to 1948.

History

She was built by Cammell Laird in 1921 as the last ship for the London and North Western Railway and put on the Holyhead - Dublin route.

She was named after the Slieve Donard (derived from Sliabh Domhanghairt/Domhanghart) mountain in County Down, Northern Ireland. It is the highest peak of the Mourne Mountains.

She was generally employed on the Thursday mid-day trip from Dublin for the cattle-dealers returning from market.

She was scrapped in 1954.

References

1921 ships
Steamships
Ships built in Barrow-in-Furness
Ships of the London and North Western Railway
Ships of the London, Midland and Scottish Railway